Gombe United Football Club is a Nigerian football club based in Gombe. They play in the Nigeria Professional Football League. Their home stadium is the new Pantami Stadium, having moved from Abubakar Umar Memorial Stadium in 2010.

History
They were continuously in the Nigerian top flight since promotion in 1994, the longest tenure of any Northern team. They however were relegated on the last day in the 2014 season to the Nigeria National League for the first time in 20 years. They won promotion back to the top level on the last day of the 2016 season by winning their division.
They were relegated back in 2019.

Achievements
Nigerian Premier League: 0
2007 Runners-up, Super 4 Playoffs

Performance in CAF competitions
CAF Champions League: 1 appearance
2008 – First Round

West African Club Championship (UFOA Cup): 1 appearance
2009 – Second Round

Current team
As of 30 January 2019

Notes

Football clubs in Nigeria
Gombe State
Association football clubs established in 1990
1990 establishments in Nigeria
Sports clubs in Nigeria